WRVJ (91.7 FM) is a member-supported public radio station in Watertown, New York.  Owned by the State University of New York at Oswego, the station simulcasts the programming of WRVO in Oswego, New York.

External links
 www.wrvo.fm

RVJ
NPR member stations
State University of New York at Oswego
Radio stations established in 1990
1990 establishments in New York (state)